Tamara Kocić (born 17 July 2003) is a Serbian handball player for Bekament Bukovička Banja and the Serbian national team.

She represented Serbia at the 2021 World Women's Handball Championship.

References

External links

Serbian female handball players
2003 births
Living people
People from Belgrade
Expatriate handball players